The South of England appeared in first-class cricket between 1836 and 1961, most often in the showcase North v. South matches against the North of England although there were also games against touring teams, MCC and others.

The inaugural North v. South fixture was held at Lord's on 11 & 12 July 1836.  The North won by 6 wickets.

References

External sources
 CricketArchive – list of fixtures

Further reading
 Rowland Bowen, Cricket: A History of its Growth and Development, Eyre & Spottiswoode, 1970
 Arthur Haygarth, Scores & Biographies, Volume 2 (1827-1840), Lillywhite, 1862

Former senior cricket clubs